Plopiș is a commune in Sălaj County, Crișana, Romania. It is composed of three villages: Făgetu (Hungarian: Magyarpatak, Slovak: Gemelčička), Iaz (Krasznajáz) and Plopiș.

Sights 
 Nature reserve ″Mlaștina de la Iaz"

References

Communes in Sălaj County
Localities in Crișana